Hanzlík, Hanzlik (feminine Hanzlíková) is a Czech surname.  Notable people with this name include:

 Bill Hanzlik (born 1957), American basketball player and coach
 Jan Hanzlík (born 1982), Czech ice hockey player
 János Hanzlik
 Jaromír Hanzlík
 Jiří Hanzlík (born 1974), Czech ice hockey player
 Michaela Lucie Hanzlíková, Czech figure skater
 Steffi Hanzlik, German skeleton racer
 Kyleigh Hanzlik (born 1998), American ice hockey player
 Tyler Hanzlik (born 1992), American ice hockey player
 Bob Hanzlik (born 1924), American football player

See also
3257 Hanzlík, a main belt asteroid

Czech-language surnames